John Miles was the member of Parliament for Great Grimsby in 1404.

References 

Year of birth missing
Year of death missing
English MPs October 1404
Members of the Parliament of England for Great Grimsby